John Edward McKenzie Lucie-Smith (born 27 February 1933), known as Edward Lucie-Smith, is a  Jamaican-born English writer, poet, art critic, curator and broadcaster.  He has been highly prolific in these fields, writing or editing over a hundred books, his subjects gradually shifting around the late 1960s from mostly literature to mostly art.

Biography
Lucie-Smith was born in Kingston, Jamaica, the son of Mary Frances (née Lushington) and John Dudley Lucie-Smith. He moved to the United Kingdom in 1946. He was educated at The King's School, Canterbury, and, after a little time in Paris, he read history at Merton College, Oxford, from 1951 to 1954.

After serving in the Royal Air Force as an education officer and working as a copywriter, he became a full-time writer (as well as anthologist and photographer). He succeeded Philip Hobsbaum in organising The Group, a London-centred poets' group.

At the beginning of the 1980s he conducted several series of interviews, Conversations with Artists, for BBC Radio 3. He was a contributor to The London Magazine, in which he wrote art reviews, and wrote regularly for the independent magazine ArtReview from the 1960s until the 2000s. A prolific writer, he has written more than one hundred books in total on a variety of subjects, chiefly art history as well as biographies and poetry.

In addition he has curated a number of art exhibitions, including three Peter Moores projects at the Walker Art Gallery in Liverpool; the New British Painting (1988–90) and two retrospectives at the New Orleans Museum of Art. He is a curator of the Bermondsey Project Space.

In recent years Edward Lucie-Smith has been promoting drawings attributed to Francis Bacon owned by Italian journalist Cristiano Lovatelli Ravarino. However, Christie's, Sotheby's and the Francis Bacon Estate have not authenticated these works known as the 'Francis Bacon Italian Drawings'. Martin Harrison, the editor of the Francis Bacon: Catalogue Raisonné, does not include 'The Francis Bacon Italian Drawings' and does not see the hand of Bacon in these drawings.

His uncle Euan Lucie-Smith was one of the first mixed-heritage infantry officers in a regular British Army regiment, and the first killed in World War I.

Bibliography

Poetry and fiction

A Tropical Childhood and Other Poems (1961)
Confessions & Histories (1964)
Penguin Modern Poets 6 (1964; with Jack Clemo and George MacBeth)
A Game of French and English (1965) poems
Jazz for the N.U.F. (1965)
Mystery in the Universe: Notes on An Interview with Allen Ginsberg (1965)
The Penguin Book of Elizabethan Verse (1965), editor
A Choice of Browning's Verse (1967)
Five Great Odes by Paul Claudel (1967), translator
Borrowed Emblems (1967)
Jonah: Selected Poems of Jean-Paul de Dadelsen (1967), translator
Silence (1967), poetry
The Penguin Book of Satirical Verse (1967), editor
The Little Press Movement in England and America (1968)
More Beasts for Guillaume Apollinaire (1968)
Snow Poem (1968)
Towards Silence (1968)
Egyptian Ode (1969)
Holding Your Eight Hands (1969; science fiction verse anthology), editor
Six Kinds of Creature (1969)
Six More Beasts (1970)
British Poetry since 1945 (1970 anthology), editor
The Rhino (1971) with Ralph Steadman
A Garland from the Greek (1971)
French Poetry Today: a bilingual anthology (1971; co-editor, with Simon Watson Taylor)
Primer of Experimental Poetry 1, 1870–1922. Volume I (1971) editor
Two Poems of the Night (1972; with Ralph Steadman)
The Well-Wishers (1974)
The Dark Pageant (1977)
One Man Show (1981), with Beryl Cook
Private View (1981), with Beryl Cook
Bertie and the Big Red Ball (1982; with Beryl Cook)
Beasts with Bad Morals (1984)
Poems for Clocks (1986)
The lesson (2001)
Changing Shape: New and Selected Poems (2002)

Non-fiction

1960–1979
Rubens (1961)
What Is a Painting? (1966)
Liverpool Scene: Recorded Live along the Mersey Beat (1967) editor
Sergei De Diaghileff (1929) (1968) with Anthony Howell
Thinking about Art: Critical Essays (1968)
Movements in Art since 1945 (1969)
Art in Britain 1969–70 (1970) with Patricia White
A Concise History of French Painting (1971)
Eroticism in Western Art (1972; revised as Sexuality in Western Art, 1991)
Symbolist Art (1972)
Movements in Modern Art (1973; with Donald Carroll)
The First London Catalogue (1974)
Late Modern: The Visual Arts Since 1945 (1975)
The Invented Eye: Masterpieces of Photography, 1839–1914 (1975)
The Waking Dream Fantasy and the Surreal in Graphic Art 1450–1900 (1975; with Aline Jacquot)
The Burnt Child: An Autobiography (1975)
World of the Makers: Today's Master Craftsmen and Craftswomen (1975)
How the Rich Lived: The Painter as Witness 1870–1914 (1976; with Celestine Dars)
Fantin-Latour (1977)
Art Today: From Abstract Expressionism to Superrealism (1977)
Joan of Arc (1977)
Toulouse-Lautrec (1977)
Work and Struggle: The Painter as Witness, 1870–1914 (1977; with Celestine Dars)
Outcasts of the Sea: Pirates and Piracy (1978)
A Concise History of Furniture (1979)
A Cultural Calendar of the 20th Century (1979)
Super Realism (1979)

1980–1999
Art in the Seventies (1980)
The Story of Craft: The Craftsman's Role in Society (Phaidon, Oxford, 1981)
The Art of Caricature (1981)
The Body Images of the Nude (1981)
The Sculpture of Helaine Blumenfeld (1982)
A History of Industrial Design (1983)
The Thames & Hudson Dictionary of Art Terms (1984)
Nudes and Flowers: 40 Watercolours by David Hutter (1984)
Steve Hawley (1984)
Art of the 1930s: The Age of Anxiety (1985)
American Art Now (1985)
Lives of the Great Twentieth Century Artists (1985)
The Male Nude: A Modern View (1985; with François De Louville; the book features Hockney, Kitaj & Shaw), et al.)
Michael Leonard: Paintings (1985; with Lincoln Kirstein)
American Craft Today: Poetry of the Physical (1986; with Paul J. Smith)
Sculpture Since 1945 (1987)
The Self Portrait: A Modern View (1987; with Sean Kelly)
The New British Painting (1988; with Carolyn Cohen and Judith Higgins)
The Essential Osbert Lancaster: An Anthology in Brush and Pen (1988) editor
Impressionist Women (1989)
Art in the Eighties (1990)
Art Deco Painting (1990)
Fletcher Benton (1990; with Paul J. Karlstrom)
Jean Rustin (1990)
Harry Holland: The Painter and Reality (1991)
Keith Vaughan 1912–1977: Drawings of the Young Male (1991)
Wendy Taylor (1992)
Andres Nagel (1992)
Alexander (1992)
Art and Civilization (1992)
The Faber Book of Art Anecdotes (1992), editor
Luis Caballero: Paintings & Drawings (1992)
20th Century Latin American Art (1993)
Edward Lucie-Smith on Elizabeth Fritsch: Vessels from another World, Metaphysical pots Painted Stoneware, Bellew Publishing, (1993)British Art Now – A Personal View (1993; with Zsuzsi Roboz and Max Wykes-Joyce)Fritz Scholder, A Survey of Paintings 1970–1993 (1993)Race, Sex and Gender in Contemporary Art: The Rise of Minority Culture (1994)Elisabeth Frink: A Portrait (1994)John Kirby: The Company of Strangers (1994)American Realism (1994)Art Today (1995)Panayiotis Kalorkoti, Reflections of Grizedale (Acrylics, Watercolours, Etchings) (1995)Visual Arts in the 20th Century (1996)Leonardo Nierman: 1987–1994 Painting/Sculpture/Tapestry (1996)Albert Paley (1996)Ars Erotica: An Arousing History of Erotic Art (1997)Dunbar Mining The Surfaces (1997)Glenys Barton (1997; with Adrian Flowers and Robin Gibson)Impressionist Women: Reality Observed (1997)Adam: The Male Figure in Art (1998)Chadwick (1998)Zoo: Animals in Art (1998)Lives of the Great 20th Century Artists (1999)Sean Henry – the Centre of the Universe (1999; with Beatrice F. Buscaroli)Women and Art: Contested Territory (1999), with Judy Chicago

2000 to presentJudy Chicago: An American Vision (2000)Flesh and Stone (2000)Sergio Ceccotti, Editions Lachenal & Ritter, Paris, 2001.Art Tomorrow (2002)Roberto Marquez (2002)David Remfry: Dancers (2003; with Dore Ashton and Carter Ratcliff)Color of Time: The Photographs of Sean Scully (2004; with Arthur C. Danto and Mia Fineman)Elias Rivera (2006; Foreword by Gene Hackman)Censoring the Body (2007)Byzantium & Beyond: The Paintings of Dave Pearson (2012; with Margaret Mytton)Amazonia Imagined (2016)
Pop Expressionism (2016)Steven Heffer; A Very British Modernist (2016)
Painting with Both Hands (2017)New Dimensions in Art (2017)

References

External links
Biography
LibraryThing author profile
Long interview, 2017
Edward Lucie-Smith papers at the University of Maryland libraries
Materials related to Lucie-Smith can be found in the Turret Books records at the University of Maryland libraries

1933 births
Living people
People from Kingston, Jamaica
People educated at The King's School, Canterbury
Alumni of Merton College, Oxford
Writers from London
British art critics
British art historians
British biographers
British male poets
British art curators
John Llewellyn Rhys Prize winners
Fellows of the Royal Society of Literature
The London Magazine people
Male biographers